Rick Hansen (born March 1, 1963) is an American politician serving in the Minnesota House of Representatives since 2005. A member of the Minnesota Democratic-Farmer-Labor Party (DFL), Hansen represents District 53B in the southeastern Twin Cities metropolitan area, which includes the cities of South St. Paul, Inver Grove Heights, Cottage Grove and St. Paul Park, and parts ofDakota and Washington Counties in Minnesota.

Early life, education, and career

Hansen was raised on a farm in rural Minnesota. He graduated magna cum laude from Upper Iowa University in Fayette, with a BS degree in biology, and later earned a MS degree in soil management from Iowa State University in Ames. He worked for Harmony Cedar, Inc., a company that makes handcrafted Amish furniture, and for Minnesota's Department of Agriculture from 1998 to 2005. He served on the Dakota County Soil and Water Conservation District Board of Managers from 1996 to 2005.

Minnesota House of Representatives
Hansen was first elected to the Minnesota House of Representatives in 2004, after the retirement of DFL incumbent Tom Pugh, and has been reelected every two years since.

In 2008, House Speaker Margaret Anderson Kelliher appointed Hansen to the Minnesota Lessard Outdoor Heritage Council. Hansen served as an assistant majority leader from 2011-12. From 2007-08, he chaired the Watersheds, Wetlands and Buffers Division of the Environment and Natural Resources Committee. In 2018, Hansen was named chair of the Environment and Natural Resources Finance Committee, which in 2021 was consolidated into the Environment and Natural Resources Finance and Policy Committee, which Hansen currently chairs. Hansen also sits on the Agriculture Finance and Policy, Capital Investment, and State and Local Government Finance and Policy Committees.

Electoral history

Personal life
Hansen is married and has one child.

References

External links

Rep. Hansen Web Page
Rick Hansen Campaign Web Site

1963 births
Living people
Upper Iowa University alumni
Iowa State University alumni
People from South St. Paul, Minnesota
Democratic Party members of the Minnesota House of Representatives
21st-century American politicians
People from Albert Lea, Minnesota